Les fêtes de Polymnie (The Festivals of Polyhymnia) is an opéra-ballet in three entrées and a prologue by Jean-Philippe Rameau. The work was first performed on 12 October 1745 at the Opéra, Paris, and is set to a libretto by Louis de Cahusac. The piece was written to celebrate the French victory at the Battle of Fontenoy in the War of the Austrian Succession. It was revived at the same venue on 21 August 1753.

Neither Cuthbert Girdlestone nor Graham Sadler (in the New Penguin Guide) consider this among Rameau's finest works, though both remark on the originality of its overture, which breaks the traditional Lullian mould common to French overtures up to  that time.

Roles
Information taken from the site Rameau2014.fr.

Synopsis

The prologue, Le temple de Mémoire ("The Temple of Memory"), describes the victory of Fontenoy in allegorical fashion. The first entrée is entitled La fable (Legend) and depicts the marriage of Hercules and Hebe, the goddess of youth. The second entrée, L'histoire ("History"), tells the story of the Hellenistic king of Syria Seleucus I Nicator, who gives up his fiancée Stratonice when he learns his son Antiochus I Soter is passionately in love with her (this tale was also the subject of a later 18th century French opera, Étienne Méhul's Stratonice). The third and final entrée is called La féerie ("Fairy tale") and is set in the Middle East. Through her love for him, Argélie redeems Zimès from the power of the evil fairy Alcine.

Recording
Les fêtes de Polymnie Véronique Gens, Emöke Baráth, Aurélia Legay, Mathias Vidal, Thomas Dolié,  Purcell Choir, Orfeo Orchestra conducted by György Vashegyi (2 CDs, Glossa 2015)

References

Sources

Holden, Amanda (Ed.), The New Penguin Opera Guide, New York: Penguin Putnam, 2001. 
Girdlestone, Cuthbert, Jean-Philippe Rameau: His Life and Work (Dover paperback edition, 1969)
Sadler, Graham, (Ed.), The New Grove French Baroque Masters Grove/Macmillan, 1988

External links

Operas by Jean-Philippe Rameau
French-language operas
Operas
1745 operas
Opéras-ballets
Ballets by Jean-Philippe Rameau
Ballets by Louis de Cahusac
Opera world premieres at the Paris Opera